Coeliades ernesti is a butterfly in the family Hesperiidae. This species originates from Madagascar but was also introduced to Réunion and Mauritius (1980). Their habitat consists of forests, secondary forests and anthropogenic areas.

They have a wingspan of around 56 mm. The body and the base of its wings are of shining blue, wings are black and metallic blue, and the ventral face of the wings is brown and white. This species flies very quickly and can hardly be observed in flight.

A known host plant of their larvae is a Malpighiaceae, Hiptage benghalensis.

References

External links
Insecte.org: pictures of Coeliades ernesti

Butterflies described in 1867
Coeliadinae
Butterflies of Africa
Taxa named by Alfred Grandidier